Marcello Vernola (born 4 March 1961 in Bari) is an Italian politician who was a Member of the European Parliament between 2004 and 2009 for one of the Southern seats. He was a member of Forza Italia, part of the European People's Party and sat on the European Parliament's Committee on the Environment, Public Health and Food Safety.

He was a substitute for the Committee on Foreign Affairs, substitute for the
Delegation to the EU-Romania Joint Parliamentary Committee.

Education
 1986: Graduate in law
 lawyer dealing with administrative cases
 2004: defence counsel at the Court of Cassation
 2003: Professor under contract to the University of Bari - School of Specialisation in European Community law
 Professor under contract to the University of Cassino - Faculty of Law - lecturing on 'public services'

Career
 1990-1995: Municipal Councillor of Bari
 1996-1991: Member of the National Executive of the DC Youth Movement
 1998-2000: Member of the PPI National Council
 1999-2004: Chairman of the Provincial Council of Bari
 1999-2004: Chairman of the Union of Apulian Provincial Councils
 2002-2003: Member of the consultative body for local authorities and for the Mezzogiorno of the 'Margherita' party

See also
 2004 European Parliament election in Italy

References

External links
 
 
 

1961 births
Living people
People from Bari
Presidents of the Province of Bari
Forza Italia MEPs
MEPs for Italy 2004–2009
21st-century Italian politicians